Mel's Diner is the setting for the 1976−1985 American TV series Alice. It is a fictional roadside diner on the outskirts of Phoenix, Arizona, that serves locals and truckers. It has a counter, two large booths and a couple of tables. Although one of the three waitresses, Alice, is the main character, the show revolves around all of the waitresses and Mel Sharples, the owner and cook. Most scenes of the show take place in the diner as well.

Throughout the run of the series, Mel's Diner has a reputation, especially among its regular customers, for serving terrible food, though, more often than not, this is meant to be a joke.  Mel's is noted for its gourmet chili, which is referred to as "Mel's Famous Chili". In the episode 'Sharples vs Sharples', Mel's mother, Carrie (Martha Raye), publishes a cookbook with Mel's chili recipe in it and the two fight about whose recipe it really is.  Carrie takes it out of the book because Mel claims "it's mine, mine, mine".

The outside shot of the diner's sign with the giant coffee cup sometimes seen in the opening credits of Alice is of a real Mel's Diner (1747 NW Grand Avenue) in Phoenix. The sign was seen by a producer scouting Phoenix for an establishing shot. It had been "Chris’ Diner" but the owner agreed to change the name to "Mel's" for the show and is called the same to this day.

In the "Mel Spins His Wheels" episode, Alice informs a customer that the diner's address is 2128 Bush Highway.  However, in a subsequent episode ("Big Bad Mel"), the diner's address is given as 1130 Bush Highway.  In the "Alice's Blind Date" episode, Alice states over the payphone that the address is 1030 Bush Highway when telling her date where to pick her up.

In Alice Doesn't Live Here Anymore, the movie on which the series Alice is based, the restaurant is called Mel & Ruby's Cafe, located in Tucson, Arizona.

References

Fictional diners